The Kilkenny Senior Hurling League (known for sponsorship reasons as the St. Canice's Credit Union Senior Hurling League) is an annual hurling competition organised by the Kilkenny County Board of the Gaelic Athletic Association since 1992 for the top hurling teams in the county of Kilkenny in Ireland.

The series of games are played over the spring, summer and autumn months with the league final currently being played at Nowlan Park in September. The prize for the winning team is the Matty Power Cup.

The league has 12 teams divided into two groups with six teams in each group. Each team in each group plays each other once with the top team in each group progressing to the final. Promotion and relegation between the senior league and lower leagues are a central feature, while a team's finishing position in the league impacts on the subsequent Kilkenny Senior Championship.

The title has been won at least once by 11 different teams. The all-time record-holders are Ballyhale Shamrocks, who have won a total of 8 titles.

Dicksboro are the title-holders (2020) after defeating O'Loughlin Gaels 3–2 in a penalty shoot-out in the final.

Sponsorship
Since 1992 the Kilkenny Senior Hurling League has been sponsored by the St. Canice's Credit Union.

Trophy
The winning team is presented with the Matty Power Cup. A native of Graiguenamanagh, Matty Power (1899-1965) played hurling for Dicksboro and Garda. He won five All-Ireland medals with Kilkenny and Dublin.

Roll of honour

There was no competition in 2004 and 2005.

References

External links
 Kilkenny GAA website

Hurling competitions in Leinster
Hurling competitions in County Kilkenny